Charlie Letchas (October 3, 1915 – March 14, 1995) was an American professional baseball player.  He was a second baseman, third baseman and shortstop for parts of four seasons (1939, 1941, 1944, 1946) with the Philadelphia Phillies and Washington Senators.  For his career, he compiled a .234 batting average, with one home run and 37 runs batted in.  In addition, Letchas played 16 seasons for 13 teams in the minor leagues.

He was born in Thomasville, Georgia and later died in Tampa, Florida at the age of 79.

References

External links

1915 births
1995 deaths
Philadelphia Phillies players
Washington Senators (1901–1960) players
Major League Baseball infielders
Baseball players from Georgia (U.S. state)
Spartanburg Spartans players
Chattanooga Lookouts players
Baltimore Orioles (IL) players
Atlanta Crackers players
Toronto Maple Leafs (International League) players
New Orleans Pelicans (baseball) players
Indianapolis Indians players
Anniston Rams players
Birmingham Barons players
Little Rock Travelers players
Richmond Colts players